Equisetum giganteum, with the common name southern giant horsetail, is a species of horsetail native to South America and Central America, from central Chile east to Brazil and north to southern Mexico.

Description
The stems are the stoutest of any horsetail, 1–2 cm diameter (up to 3.5 cm  (1.33 inches) in diameter in some populations), and bear numerous whorls of very slender branches; these branches are not further branched, but some terminate in spore cones. Unlike some other horsetails, it does not have separate photosynthetic sterile and non-photosynthetic spore-bearing stems.

Populations from northern Chile with very stout stems up to 3.5 cm diameter have sometimes been treated as a separate species Equisetum xylochaetum, but this is not widely regarded as distinct.

References

External links

fiu.edu: Giant Horsetails
 Lorenzi, H. & Souza, M. S. (2001). Plantas Ornamentais no Brasil: arbustivas, herbáceas e trepadeiras. Online 

giganteum
Ferns of the Americas
Flora of Central America
Flora of South America
Flora of Brazil
Flora of Chile
Flora of Colombia
Flora of Costa Rica
Flora of Ecuador
Flora of Panama
Flora of Mexico
Flora of Venezuela
Flora of the Yucatán Peninsula
Plants described in 1759
Garden plants of Central America
Garden plants of South America
Taxa named by Carl Linnaeus